Miezis (feminine: Mieze) is a Latvian masculine surname meaning "barley". Notable people with the surname include:

Gvido Miezis (born 1980), Latvian cyclist
Nauris Miezis (born 1991), Latvian basketball player
Normunds Miezis (born 1971), Latvian chess player

Latvian-language masculine surnames